The 14th Cinemalaya Independent Film Festival was held from August 3–12, 2018 in Metro Manila, Philippines. A total of ten full-length features and ten short films competed. The festival was opened by Erik Matti's BuyBust and was closed by Peng Fei Song's The Taste of Rice Flower.

Entries
The winning film is highlighted with boldface and a dagger.

Full-Length Features

Short films

Awards
The awards ceremony was held on August 12, 2018, at the Cultural Center of the Philippines.

Full-Length Features
 Best Film – Kung Paano Hinihintay Ang Dapithapon by Carlo Enciso Catu
 Special Jury Prize – Pan de Salawal by Che Espiritu
 Audience Choice Award – Liway by Kip Oebanda
 Best Direction – Che Espiritu for Pan de Salawal
 Best Actor – Eddie Garcia for ML
 Best Actress – Ai-ai delas Alas for School Service
 Best Supporting Actor –  Ketchup Eusebio for Mamang
 Best Supporting Actress – Therese Malvar for Distance and School Service
 Best Screenplay – John Carlo Pacala for Kung Paano Hinihintay Ang Dapithapon
 Best Cinematography – Neil Daza for Kung Paano Hinihintay Ang Dapithapon
 Best Editing – Mikael Pestano for ML
 Best Sound – Wild Sound for Musmos na Sumibol sa Gubat ng Digma
 Best Original Music Score – Len Calvo for Pan de Salawal
 Best Production Design – Marielle Hizon for Kung Paano Hinihintay Ang Dapithapon
 NETPAC Award – Kung Paano Hinihintay Ang Dapithapon by Carlo Enciso Catu

Short films
 Best Short Film – Jodilerks dela Cruz: Employee of the Month by Carlo Francisco Manatad
 Special Jury Prize – Si Astri Maka Si Tambulah by Xeph Suarez
 Audience Choice Award – Kiko by Jojo Driz
 Best Direction – Xeph Suarez for Si Astri Maka Si Tambulah
 Best Screenplay – Christian Candelaria for Sa Saiyang Isla
 NETPAC Award –  Sa Saiyang Isla by Christian Candelaria

References

External links
Cinemalaya Independent Film Festival

Cinemalaya Independent Film Festival
Cine
Cine
2018 in Philippine cinema